H&R may refer to:
H&R Block, a tax preparation company
H&R Firearms, a firearm manufacturer